For the First Time is a studio album by Kim Weston, recorded after her departure from Motown Records. She had previously recorded an album with Marvin Gaye, so this album is her first true solo album. The album was arranged by Wade Marcus, Slide Hampton, Larry Wilcox, Melba Liston and Tad Jones.

Track listing

Personnel
Mickey Stevenson, Jr. - producer
Val Valentin - director of engineering
Acy R. Lehman - cover design
Chuck Stewart - cover photograph
Wade Marcus - arranger ("Where Am I Going?" and "Come Back to Me")
Slide Hampton - arranger  ("Free Again," "The Beat Goes On," "If You Go Away" and "That's Life")
Larry Wilcox - arranger  ("Everything in the World I Love")
Melba Liston - arranger  ("When the Sun Comes Out", "In the Dark" and "Come Rain or Come Shine")
Tad Jones - arranger  ("Walking Happy")

References

1967 albums
Kim Weston albums
Albums arranged by Wade Marcus
Albums produced by William "Mickey" Stevenson
MGM Records albums